Mikhail Artemyevich  Kuznetsov (25 February 1918 – 23 August 1986) was a Soviet film and theater actor. He was an Honored Artist of the Ukrainian SSR (1955), People's Artist of the RSFSR (1964), and the winner of the Stalin Prize of the first degree (1952).

His cousin was Anatoly Kuznetsov.

Selected filmography

1940: The Friends as Ilya Korzun
1942: Mashenka as Solovyev
1943: Actress as Soldier on the concert (uncredited)
1943: Taxi to Heaven as Kolya
1944: Ivan the Terrible as 
1945: It Happened in the Donbass as underground worker
1947: In the Name of Life as Doctor Aleksandr Kolesov
1948: Private Aleksandr Matrosov as Captain Kolosov
1951: Bountiful Summer as Pyotr Sereda
1951: Taras Shevchenko as soldier Skobelev
1953: Adventure in Odessa as Andrey Andreyevich Belov, uchitel geografii
1954: Marina's Destiny as Tarass Vassilievich
1954: Commander of the Ship as Captain Andrei Vysotin
1955: More studyonoye as Crewman Fedor Verigin
1955: Sailor Chizhik as Fedos Chyzhyk
1958: Ivan the Terrible, Part II  as Fyodor Basmanov
1958: E.A. — Extraordinary Accident as Anton Semenovich Kovalenko
1959: The Magic Weaver as Old soldier
1964: The Blue Notebook as Vladimir Lenin
1965: The Salvos of the Aurora Cruiser as Lenin
1965: The Hyperboloid of Engineer Garin as Hlynov
1972: We and Our Mountains as Pavle (voice)
1978: Guarneri Quartet as Pyotr Grigoryevich Laktionov
1985: Bagration as Mikhail Kutuzov
1985: The Hobbit as Fili

References

External links
 

Russian male actors
Soviet male actors
Ukrainian male actors
People's Artists of the RSFSR
Stalin Prize winners
1918 births
1986 deaths
People from Noginsk
Recipients of the title of Merited Artist of Ukraine